Doggumentary is the eleventh studio album by American West Coast hip hop recording artist Snoop Dogg. It was released on March 29, 2011 on the Priority Records record label. The album was produced by Battlecat, The Cataracs, Gorillaz, David Banner, THX, DJ Khalil, Fredwreck, Jake One, David Guetta, Mike Dean, Jeff Bhasker, Lex Luger, Meech Wells, Mr. Porter, Rick Rock, Rick Rude, Scoop DeVille, Scott Storch, Warryn Campbell, Kanye West, DJ Reflex, among others.

It was supported by the singles "Wet" and "Boom".

Doggumentary received mixed reviews from most critics. The album debuted at number eight on the US Billboard 200. The album serves as the follow-up to Snoop's tenth studio album Malice n Wonderland (2009).

Background
Snoop Dogg first announced that he was working on a sequel to his 1993 debut album Doggystyle during a studio session with Hip hop producer and rapper Swizz Beatz. The two stated they knocked out eighteen tracks and Snoop ended the video out saying he gave him some gangsta tracks, some R&B tracks and some Hip Hop tracks. Snoop Dogg called off plans to release the sequel to his classic debut Doggystyle, instead opting for the title Doggumentary Music for his 11th studio album, set for release in March 2011 on Priority/EMI Records. "I have been in the game for so long and still have the same passion I did when I first started. I want my fans to ride with me on this one and know that I am so focused on bringing good music to them," explained the veteran MC. "It's called Doggumentary Music because this is my life and I want to share my music, and my process of making it, with the fans."

Recording 
Rap-Up reported that Snoop Dogg has recorded with Wiz Khalifa on a track, titled “This Weed Iz Mine.” The smokers’ anthem is scheduled to appear on Snoop's 11th studio album Doggumentary Music, along with the Scoop DeVille-produced lead single “New Year's Eve and with other songs including “Rollin’ in My Malibu,” “Oh Boy,” and collaborations with Lil Jon and Swizz Beatz. The rapper announced plans to work with Katy Perry again after the pair's number one single "California Gurls" stating, "We're trying to get together and do something on my new album...so [I'm] definitely in contact with her." Snoop told OK! magazine about Perry, "She's a sweet girl, and I had fun making the record with her. Like I said, I'm looking forward to her being on my record as well." Snoop Dogg also recorded with Damon Albarn's animated alternative hip hop group Gorillaz. The song is reportedly left over from the Plastic Beach sessions, in which Snoop collaborated on the track "Welcome to the World of the Plastic Beach" Snoop said about the collaboration: "We did that record in London, England at their studio. The track made me wanna' sing & have fun & what not I don't give a fuck, it's like maybe I can smoke witchu' maybe I can't, you know what I'm saying?"
Snoop Dogg revealed to MTV that he was looking to get a Britney Spears duet for the album. On November 27, 2010 Snoop Dogg was in the studio with producer David Banner who produced two beats for him.

On December 8, 2010, Snoop Dogg reported to Complex magazine that featured artists will include Daz Dillinger, Too Short, Bootsy Collins,  Kokane,  Ne-Yo, Marty James, Pilot,  Gorillaz, John Legend,  Trey Songz, Wiz Khalifa, and LaToiya Williams with production on the album from  Scoop DeVille, Jake One,  Fredwreck, the Cataracs, David Guetta, J-Kwon, Gorillaz, Denaun Porter, Warryn Campbell, David Banner, Meech Wells, Kanye West, Black Mob, Trylogy, and Rick Rude.

However, on February 9, 2011, EMI released a poster that announced some of the guests, which included Kanye West, Wiz Khalifa, Gorillaz, R. Kelly, T-Pain, Young Jeezy, E-40, and more. The producers include Kanye West, Lex Luger, Scott Storch, David Guetta, the Cataracs, Battlecat, Fredwreck, and more.

Release and promotion 
Snoop Dogg announced via Twitter that he would be joining the ranks of emcees Kanye West, Timbaland, Crooked I, and the many prior who released weekly songs in preparation for upcoming projects. Dubbed "Puff Puff Pass Tuesdays," Snoop plans to release a new song each week starting January 11, 2011 (with song "El Lay"), until the release of his album.

Reception 

Doggumentary received mixed reviews from most music critics. At Metacritic, which assigns a normalized rating out of 100 to reviews from mainstream critics, the album received an average score of 58, based on 15 reviews, which indicates "mixed or average reviews". Rave Magazine gave it two-and-a-half stars.

Commercial performance 
Doggumentary debuted at number eight on the US Billboard 200 chart, selling 50,000 copies in its first week, marking the fourth highest debut of the week. It serves as Snoop Dogg's eleventh top-ten album in the United States. The album dropped to the number 35 in its second week, selling an additional 14,000 units. In its third week, the album selling 7,800 copies, for a third-week total of 72,000 units.

Singles 
"New Year's Eve" was the first official promotional single released from Doggumentary, it was released on November 5, 2010, on the iTunes Store. The track peaked on the Hot R&B/Hip-Hop Songs at number 66. The song features American singer and songwriter Marty James and is produced by Scoop DeVille, producer of Snoop's 2009 single "I Wanna Rock". It did not however make the final cut of the album.

"Wet" the first official lead single from the album. The song was recorded specifically for Prince William's bachelor's party. Snoop's spokespeople bill the song as a sequel to 2007's "Sexual Eruption." Produced by the Cataracs of Far East Movement fame, Snoop spoke of the gift “When I heard the royal family wanted to have me perform in celebration of Prince William's marriage, I knew I had to give them a little something." He continued, “’Wet’ is the perfect anthem for Prince William or any playa to get the club smokin’." The song was released on iTunes on December 17, 2010. The edited version, entitled "Sweat" will be released to US urban radio stations on January 11, 2011. The single entered the Hot R&B/Hip-Hop Songs at number 57, it charted at number 25 on the Hot Rap Tracks chart. The official remix, featuring Jim Jones and Shawty Lo, was released on February 8, 2011 as a part of Snoop Dogg's Puff Puff Pass Tuesdays giveaway.

"Gangbang Rookie" was the second official promotional single from the album. The track features rapper Pilot and was released to the iTunes Store on January 14, 2011. The single was produced by Jake One.

"Platinum" was the third official promotional single from the album. The track features singer R. Kelly and was released to the iTunes Store on February 22, 2011. The single was produced by Lex Luger. Snoop Dogg revealed to MTV about the collaboration "I think me and Kells understand who we are and what we do to make each other better," Snoop said. "He has a deep love for music, and sometimes he goes over the head of the people that's listening just like myself, because we're too in-depth with music. We don't just listen to our genre. We find ourselves enjoying all walks of music." The song, however, almost didn't make the final cut, as Snoop had finished up recording the album. Snoop's friend previewed the Lex Luger track for the rapper, which impressed him enough to jot down a few bars. After sending his sketch to Kelly, the crooner replied with his own rough demo, leading the pair to finally complete the record.

"Boom" featuring singer T-Pain is the second official lead single from the album. Produced by Scott Storch the song features samples from 1980s’ hit Situation by Yazoo. The song was released in the iTunes Store on March 8, 2011, with the video set for release that same day. The single entered the Billboard Hot 100 at number 76.

Snoop Dogg has filmed seven more music videos for the album. The seven include one with guest rappers E-40 and Young Jeezy for "My Fuckin' House", a video with singer/producer Mr. Porter, the producer and featured artist for the song "My Own Way", one with rapper Pilot for "Gangbang Rookie", another  with rapper Wiz Khalifa for "This Weed Iz Mine", one for "El Lay" featuring Marty James, an animated video for "Take U Home", featuring Too Short, Kokane, and Daz Dillinger, and a video for Snoop's song "The Way Life Used to Be".

Track listing 

 (co.) Co-producer
 (add.) Additional production

Sample credits
 "Toyz N Da Hood" contains samples of "(Not Just) Knee Deep", written by George Clinton and Philippé Wynne.
 "The Way Life Used to Be" contains samples of "Why You Treat Me So Bad" written by Jay King, Thomas McElroy and Denzil Foster and performed by Club Nouveau; "Bad Boy (Having a Party)" written by Sam Cooke, Luther Vandross and Marcus Miller; "Reflections" written by Lamont Dozier, Brian Holland and Eddie Holland, and performed by The Supremes; and features excerpts of "The Way Life Used to Be" performed by Luther Vandross
 "Wonder What It Do" contains interpolations of "Oh Honey" written by Ken Gold and Michael Lawrence Denne; "Lowdown" written by David Paich and William Scaggs and performed by Boz Scaggs; and "Heart Beat" written by Kenton Nix.
 "Peer Pressure" contains interpolations of "Street Life" written by Will Jennings and Leslie Sample.
 "Boom" contains interpolations of "Situation" written by Geneviève Alison Jane Moyet and Vincent John Martin, and performed by Yazoo.
 "We Rest N Cali" contains samples of "Heartbreaker" written by Larry Troutman and Roger Troutman, and performed by Zapp.
 "This Weed Iz Mine" contains samples of "This Beat Is Mine" written by Andre Booth, and performed by Vicky D.

 "Eyez Closed" contains samples of "Money (Dollar Bill Y'all)", written by James Bromley Spicer and Russell Simmons, and performed by Jimmy Spicer.
 "Raised In da Hood" contains samples of "Pistol Grip Bump" written by Eric & Nick Vidal, Dino D. Hawkins and Roger Troutman, and performed by Volume 10.
 "Cold Game" contains samples and excerpts of "Gilly Hines (In Memory of Natalie Cerame)" written by Claude B. Cave, Carlos D. Wilson, Louis W. Wilson, Ricardo A. Wilson, and performed by Mandrill.

Personnel 
Credits for Doggumentary adapted from Allmusic.

Musicians 

 Bad Lucc – vocals
 Calvin Broadus – composer
 Stephen Bruner – bass
 Antone "Chooky" Caldwell – bass
 George Clinton – composer
 Sam Cooke – composer
 Matthew Desantis, Jr. – vocals
 Dev – vocals
 DJ Pooh – vocals
 Lamont Dozier – composer
 Mamie Gunn – vocals
 Will Hamm – vocals
 Brian Holland – composer

 Eddie Holland – composer
 R. Kelly – composer
 Belinda Lipscomb – vocals
 Mickey Raphael – harmonica
 Amber Sibbett – vocals
 Larry Troutman – composer
 Roger Troutman – composer
 Luther Vandross – composer
 Kayla Waggoner – vocals
 LaToiya Williams – vocals

Technical personnel

 Deegan Mack Adams – engineer
 Tony Allen – drums
 David Banner – producer
 Dave Benck – assistant engineer
 Jeff Bhasker – keyboards
 Big Jerm – engineer
 Warryn "Baby Dubb" Campbell – producer
 The Cataracs – producer
 Mike Chav – engineer
 Ted Chung – engineer
 Bootsy Collins – drums, engineer, vocal arrangement
 Todd Cooper – engineer
 Devin Copeland – engineer
 Jason Cox – engineer
 Armond "Bamm" Davis – keyboards
 Andrew Dawson – engineer
 Daz – engineer
 Mike Dean – engineer, mixing
 Hector Delgado – engineer
 Scoop DeVille – producer
 DJ Battlecat – keyboards, mixing, percussion, producer, sound effects, talk box
 DJ Khalil – producer
 DJ Quik – mixing
 DJ Reflex – producer

 Toby Donohue – engineer
 Abel Garibaldi – engineer
 Noah Goldstein – engineer
 Gordon Groothedde – engineer
 Gorillaz – producer
 Richard Huredia – mixing
 Chris Jackson – mixing
 Tony "56" Jackson – keyboards
 Jake One – producer
 Danny Keyz – keyboards
 Anthony Kilhoffer – engineer
 Aaron "Lefty" Kimmerer – engineer
 Dennis Krinjen – assistant engineer
 Shon Lawon – engineer
 Sven Lens – engineer
 Ari Levine – mixing
 Lexus "Lex Luger" Lewis – producer
 David "Dizmix" Lopez – engineer
 Fabian Marasciullo – mixing
 Travis "Shaggy" Marshall – engineer
 Kenny McCloud – mixing
 Ian Mereness – engineer
 Alex Merzin – mixing
 Morris Mingo – keyboards
 Mr. Porter – mixing, producer

 "Fredwreck" Farid Nassar – guitar, keyboards, mixing, moog synthesizer, producer
 Willie Nelson – guitar
 Matt Price – engineer
 Khalil Abdul Rahman – drum programming, engineer, keyboards
 Erik "Mr. E." Ramos – engineer
 Erik Reichers – mixing
 James Reynolds – mixing
 Rick Rock – mixing, producer
 Ric Rude – engineer, producer
 Jason Schweitzer – mixing
 Stephen Sedgwick – engineer
 Snoop Dogg – executive producer
 Nico Solis – engineer
 Soopafly – mixing
 Scott Storch – producer
 THX – producer
 Truck Turner – engineer
 Javier Valverde – engineer
 Roel Verberk – engineer
 Vic Wainstein – engineer
 Meech Wells – producer
 Soul Mechanix – producer
 Kanye West – composer, producer
 Zoe A. Young – production coordinator
 Brian "Big Bass" Gardner – Mastering Engineer
 The Water Boyz - Remix

Charts

Weekly charts

Year-end charts

References 

2011 albums
Snoop Dogg albums
Priority Records albums
Doggystyle Records albums
Albums produced by Battlecat (producer)
Albums produced by Damon Albarn
Albums produced by David Banner
Albums produced by David Guetta
Albums produced by Mr. Porter
Albums produced by DJ Khalil
Albums produced by Fredwreck
Albums produced by Jake One
Albums produced by Jeff Bhasker
Albums produced by Kanye West
Albums produced by Lex Luger
Albums produced by Mike Dean (record producer)
Albums produced by Rick Rock
Albums produced by Scoop DeVille
Albums produced by Scott Storch
Albums produced by the Cataracs
Albums produced by Warryn Campbell